Budy Prywatne  is a village in the administrative district of Gmina Krasnosielc, within Maków County, Masovian Voivodeship, in east-central Poland.

References

Budy Prywatne